Karhu is a Finnish sports equipment company, focused on running. Originally established as "Oy Urheilutarpeita" in 1916, it was renamed "Karhu" (meaning bear in Finnish) four years later. Karhu's line of products includes sneakers, t-shirts and jackets. In past years, Karhu also manufactured skis. In 2008, the company was sold to a group of investors organised under "Karhu Holding B.V.".

Karhu is renowned for having implemented the three stripes trademark, which was then sold to German company Adidas in 1952.

History

The company was established in Helsinki, Finland, in 1916, as "Oy Urheilutarpeita". In 1920, the company was renamed "Karhu", adopting a bear as its logo. In addition to the discuses and javelins that were Karhu's main products, the company also produced running shoes and track spikes.

The Karhu brand featured prominently at the 1920 Antwerp Olympic Games, where Finnish athletes took all three medals in javelin using Karhu javelins, and the "Flying Finns" took five gold medals on the track wearing Karhu spikes. Four years later, at the 1924 Summer Olympics in Paris, Paavo Nurmi won five gold medals in track events "wearing a conspicuous pair of white Karhu running spikes".

In the 1930s, Karhu's production expanded to include cross-country and ski jumping skis. During the Winter War and Continuation War, from 1939–1945, Karhu produced snow-camouflage suits, tents and skis for the Finnish military.

In 1952, Karhu sold the "three stripes" trademark it had been using to a then little-known German brand Adidas for the equivalent of 1,600 euros and two bottles of whiskey. In the 1960s Karhu began to use the M-logo in its place. The 'M' (that comes from "Mestari" which means "master" in Finnish) is still in use on Karhu shoes.

During successive years, Karhu's innovations included the first use of nylon and air cushioning in running shoes. The 1960s also saw the development of Karhu's line of pesäpallo (Finnish baseball) equipment. In 1966, the Karhu company changed its name to "Oy Urheilu Karhu Sport Ab". By 1968, Karhu launched the Trampas, a shoe that came in two versions, one for trainers and the other for casual wear. The shoe was a great success, being used by the Finnish Olympic team, being praised by Arthur Lydiard, who called them "the best training shoe in the world". A new name change came in 1972 to "Karhu-Titan", reflecting its strong ice hockey equipment brands Titan (sticks), Koho (protective and goaltender equipment) and Jofa (helmets).

By the 1980s, the brand had started to struggle and sold off its outdoor shoe division to Merrell and its hockey division to The Hockey Company. However, a collaboration of research and design with the University of Jyväskylä led to the development of "Fulcrum technology". In 1982, Karhu launched the "Albatross" shoe model, one of the best-selling sneakers of that time. Two years later, the company launched the basketball shoe "Harlem Air" model.

In 1997, Karhu-Titan's name changed to Karhu Sporting Goods. In 2008, Karhu Sporting Goods sold the Karhu brand to Karhu Holding B.V., a Dutch holding company led by Huub Valkenburg and Jay Duke.

Karhu signed an agreement with Italian Paralympic Committee to dress athletes competing at the 2016 Summer Paralympics in Rio de Janeiro.

Products

Shoes
Karhu's main line of running shoes is based on their "Fulcrum Technology", which has been developed in cooperation with the University of Jyväskylä since the 1980s. The line includes several models for both men and women, intended to suit different types of pronation and training, off-road or trail running shoes and racing needs. In early 2000s, Karhu launched the M-Series, which earned popularity at the time, but was discontinued when Karhu was sold to foreign investors in 2008. In 2009, the Karhu Fulcrum Strong model of running shoe was awarded "Best Debut" by Runner's World magazine.

Karhu also released a line of casual shoes called Karhu Originals, a range of retro inspired footwear, which were nominated for "Sneaker of the Year 2005" at the Global Sports Style Awards in Munich in 2005.

Skis 
Market share of Karhu skis were sold in Finland each year, but greatly reduced over past two decades by the fact the same factory also supplies Yoko and Järvinen branded skis and overall ski production in Kitee went down to about one-tenth due to national and global demand decline. The major export markets for Karhu skis were Sweden, Japan, Estonia and Germany. Production of Karhu skis was briefly leased and Sporten (Cz, Now Kästle Cz) made the Karhu skis between 2013 and 2015, but the license agreement was resigned with Kitee Ski oy (known until 2012 as Karhu Ski oy) in Kitee, now KSF Sport Oy, Finland.

Further reading

References

External links

 

Sportswear brands
Finnish brands
Sporting goods manufacturers of Finland
1916 establishments in Finland
Ski equipment manufacturers
Clothing companies established in 1916